Marko Đira (born 5 May 1999) is a Croatian professional footballer who plays as a midfielder for Dinamo Zagreb.

Career statistics

Club

Notes

References

1999 births
Living people
Sportspeople from Šibenik
Croatian footballers
Croatian expatriate footballers
Croatia youth international footballers
Association football midfielders
First Football League (Croatia) players
Croatian Football League players
Slovenian PrvaLiga players
HNK Šibenik players
GNK Dinamo Zagreb II players
GNK Dinamo Zagreb players
NK Lokomotiva Zagreb players
FC Koper players
Croatian expatriate sportspeople in Slovenia
Expatriate footballers in Slovenia